The 2001 Miami Hurricanes football team represented the University of Miami during the 2001 NCAA Division I-A football season. It was the Hurricanes' 76th season of football and 11th as a member of the Big East Conference. The Hurricanes were led by first-year head coach Larry Coker and played their home games at the Orange Bowl. They finished the season 12–0 overall and 7–0 in the Big East to finish as conference champion. They were invited to the Rose Bowl, which served as the BCS National Championship Game, and defeated Nebraska, 37–14, to win the school's 5th national championship.  Eventually producing a record 38 NFL Draft picks, the 2001 Hurricanes are considered by many to be the best college football team of all time.

Pre-season motivation
In 2000, Miami was shut out of the Orange Bowl BCS National Championship Game by the BCS computers. Despite Miami beating Florida State head-to-head that season and being higher ranked in both human polls, it was Florida State, and not Miami, that BCS computers selected to challenge the Oklahoma Sooners for the national championship (Oklahoma would win, 13–2). This was because Miami had lost to No. 15 Washington 34–29 on the road, while the Seminoles' lone loss was on the road to the #7 team in the country by 3.  Nevertheless, Miami was left with a bitter sense of disappointment, believing they had been deprived of a shot at a potential national championship. That off-season, the team resolved to take the matter entirely out of the discretion of the computers by going a perfect 12–0. However, they had to do so under a new head coach, Larry Coker, who was named to the post after Butch Davis left to become head coach of the NFL's Cleveland Browns.

Schedule

Season recap

Led by quarterback Ken Dorsey, free safety Ed Reed, running back Clinton Portis, wide receiver Andre Johnson, tight end Jeremy Shockey, offensive tackle Bryant McKinnie, and linebacker Jonathan Vilma, Miami won the 2001 national championship.

at Penn State

    
    
    
    
    
    
    
    

The Hurricanes began the season with a nationally televised primetime win over Penn State in Beaver Stadium. With a 30-0 halftime Miami lead, Coker pulled his starters and Miami cruised in the second half to a 33–7 victory. The 26-point margin tied for Penn State's worst home loss under Joe Paterno.

Rutgers

Miami followed up the victory with wins over Rutgers, Pitt, and Troy State.

at Pittsburgh

Troy State

at Florida State

    
    
    
    
    
    
    
    
    
    
    

After building up a 4–0 record, Miami won over Florida State in Doak Campbell Stadium, 49–27, ending the Seminoles' 47-game home unbeaten streak.

West Virginia

The Hurricanes then defeated West Virginia, 45–3, and Temple, 38–0, before heading to Chestnut Hill to take on Boston College (BC).

Temple

at Boston College

    
    
    
    
    
    

Miami started with a 9–0 lead over the Boston College Eagles, but Miami's offense began to sputter as Dorsey struggled with the swirling winds, throwing four interceptions. The Hurricane defense picked up the slack by limiting BC to just seven points. However, in the final minute of the fourth quarter, with Miami clinging to a 12–7 lead, BC quarterback Brian St. Pierre led the Eagles from their own 30-yard line all the way down to the Hurricanes' 9-yard line. With BC on the verge of a momentous upset, St. Pierre attempted to pass to receiver Ryan Read at the Miami 2-yard line. However, the ball ricocheted off the leg of Miami cornerback Mike Rumph, landing in the hands of defensive end Matt Walters. Walters ran ten yards with the ball before teammate Ed Reed grabbed the ball out of his hands at around the Miami 20-yard line and raced the remaining 80-yards for a touchdown. Miami won 18–7.

Syracuse

After the close win over Boston College, Miami went on to win over #14 Syracuse, 59–0, and #12 Washington, 65–7, in consecutive weeks in the Orange Bowl. The combined 124–7 score is an NCAA record for largest margin of victory over consecutive ranked opponents.

Washington

at Virginia Tech

    
    
    
    
    
    
    
    
    
    

The final hurdle to the Rose Bowl BCS National Championship Game was at Virginia Tech. Miami jumped on Virginia Tech early, leading 20–3 at halftime, and 26–10 in the fourth quarter. But despite being outgained by the Hurricanes by 134 yards and being dominated in time-of-possession, the Hokies never quit. After a Virginia Tech touchdown and two-point conversion cut Miami's lead to 26–18, the Hokies blocked a Miami punt and returned it for another score, cutting Miami's lead to just two points. But with a chance to tie the game with another two-point conversion, Virginia Tech sophomore Ernest Wilford dropped a pass in the endzone. Still, the resilient Hokies had one more chance to win the game late, taking possession of the ball at midfield and needing only a field goal to take the lead. But a diving, game-saving interception by Ed Reed sealed the Miami victory, 26–24. Defeating Virginia Tech earned the top-ranked Hurricanes an invitation to the Rose Bowl to take on BCS #2 Nebraska for the national championship.

Rose Bowl

    
    
    
    
    
    
    
    

Nebraska proved to be no competition for Miami, which opened up a 34–0 halftime lead en route to a 37–14 final score. Miami won its fifth national championship in the last 18 years, and put the finishing touches on a perfect 12–0 season. Dorsey passed for 362 yards and 3 touchdowns, while wide receiver Andre Johnson caught 7 passes for 199 yards and 2 touchdowns. Meanwhile, the stifling Miami defense shut down Heisman-winner Eric Crouch and the Huskers vaunted option offense, holding Nebraska 200 yards below its season average. Dorsey and Johnson were named Rose Bowl co-Most Valuable Players.

Legacy
The 2001 Miami Hurricanes are considered by some experts and historians to be the greatest team in college football history. The Hurricanes scored 512 (42.6 points per game) points while yielding only 117 (9.75 points allowed per game). Miami beat opponents by an average of 32.9 points per game, the largest margin in the school's history, and set the NCAA record for largest margin of victory over consecutive ranked teams (124–7). The offense set the school scoring record, while the defense led the nation in scoring defense (fewest points allowed), pass defense, and turnover margin. Additionally, the Hurricane defense scored eight touchdowns of its own.  Six players earned All-American status and six players were finalists for national awards, including Maxwell Award winner, Ken Dorsey, and Outland Trophy winner, Bryant McKinnie. Dorsey was also a Heisman finalist, finishing third.

Among the numerous stars on the 2001 Miami squad were: quarterback Ken Dorsey; running backs Clinton Portis, Willis McGahee, Najeh Davenport, and Frank Gore; tight end Jeremy Shockey; wide receiver Andre Johnson; offensive tackle Bryant McKinnie; defensive linemen Jerome McDougle, William Joseph, and Vince Wilfork; linebackers Jonathan Vilma and D.J. Williams; and defensive backs Ed Reed, Mike Rumph, and Phillip Buchanon. Additional contributors included future stars Kellen Winslow II, Sean Taylor, Antrel Rolle, Vernon Carey, and Rocky McIntosh. In all, an extraordinary 17 players from the 2001 Miami football team were drafted in the first-round of the NFL Draft (5 in the 2002 NFL Draft: Buchanon, McKinnie, Reed, Rumph, and Shockey; 4 in 2003: Johnson, Joseph, McDougle, and McGahee; 6 in 2004: Carey, Taylor, Vilma, Wilfork, Williams, and Winslow; 1 in 2005: Rolle; and 1 in 2006: Kelly Jennings).

Overall, 38 members of the team would be selected in the NFL Draft. As of 2013, they had earned a combined total of 43 trips to the Pro Bowl: Ed Reed (9), Andre Johnson (7), Frank Gore (5), Vince Wilfork (5), Jeremy Shockey (4), Jonathan Vilma (3), Willis McGahee (2), Chris Myers (2), Clinton Portis (2), Antrel Rolle (2), Sean Taylor (2), Bryant McKinnie (1), and Kellen Winslow II (1). In addition, Vilma, Shockey, Wilfork, Joseph, Rolle, McKinnie, and Reed have won the Super Bowl. It has been estimated that the 2001 Hurricanes would cost nearly $120 million as an NFL team as early as 2009.

Prior to the 2006 Rose Bowl, ESPN's SportsCenter ran a special in which the 2005 USC Trojans, led by stars Matt Leinart, Reggie Bush, and LenDale White, were compared with the greatest college teams of the past 50 years, as picked by sports fans voting on ESPN.com, to determine their place in history. The 2001 Miami Hurricanes were the only team picked by fans to defeat the '05 Trojan squad, reflecting the esteem with which the 2001 Hurricanes are held in the college football world.

The team's first-, second- and third-string running backs all later became running backs with a start in the NFL, a feat only done at least five other times. It has been achieved by the 2010, 2012, 2013 and 2014 Alabama Crimson Tide football teams and the 2012 Wisconsin Badgers football team. They remain the only team to have its first-, second-, third- and fourth-string running backs all later become running backs with a start in the NFL.

Roster

Players

Starting lineup

Offense

Defense

Special teams

Depth chart

Statistics
(From 1937 to 2001, bowl games did not count towards season statistics)
 QB Ken Dorsey: 184/318 (57.9%) for 2,652 yards (8.3) with 23 TD vs. 9 INT
 RB Clinton Portis: 220 carries for 1,200 yards (5.5) with 10 TD. 12 catches for 125 yards and 1 TD.
 RB Frank Gore: 62 carries for 562 yards (9.1) with 5 TD.
 RB Willis McGahee: 67 carries for 314 yards (4.7) with 3 TD.
 TE Jeremy Shockey: 40 catches for 519 yards (13.0) and 7 TD.
 WE Andre Johnson: 37 catches, 682 yards (18.43) and 10 TD.
 WR Kevin Beard: 25 catches for 409 yards (16.4) and 2 TD.
 K Todd Sievers: 21/26 FG (80.8%).
 S Ed Reed: 9 INT, 2 TD.
 LB Jonathan Vilma: 73 tackles
 DT William Joseph: 10 sacks

Awards and honors

First Team All-Americans

 Phillip Buchanon, PR
 Joaquin Gonzalez, RT
 Bryant McKinnie, LT (consensus)
 Ed Reed, SS (consensus)
 Jeremy Shockey, TE
 Todd Sievers, K

All-Conference Selections (First Team)
 Martin Bibla, LG
 Phillip Buchanon, CB
 Freddie Capshaw, P
 Ken Dorsey, QB
 Joaquin Gonzalez, RT
 Jerome McDougle, DE
 Bryant McKinnie, LT
 Clinton Portis, RB
 Ed Reed, SS 
 Brett Romberg, C
 Jeremy Shockey, TE
 Todd Sievers, K
 Jonathan Vilma, MLB

Awards Finalists
Bold indicates winners
 Larry Coker, Coach - Paul "Bear" Bryant Award
 Phillip Buchanon, PR - Mosi Tatupu Award
 Freddie Capshaw, P - Ray Guy Award
 Ken Dorsey, QB - Maxwell Award, Heisman Trophy (3rd), Big East Offensive Player of the Year
 Joaquin Gonzalez, RT - Academic Heisman
 Bryant McKinnie, LT - Outland Trophy, Heisman Trophy (8th) 
 Ed Reed, SS - Jim Thorpe Award
 Brett Romberg, C - Rimington Trophy
 Jeremy Shockey, TE - John Mackey Award
 Todd Sievers, K - Lou Groza Award (4th)

Jack Harding University of Miami MVP Award
 Ken Dorsey, QB and Ed Reed, SS

NFL Draft selections

References

Miami
Miami Hurricanes football seasons
BCS National Champions
Big East Conference football champion seasons
Rose Bowl champion seasons
Lambert-Meadowlands Trophy seasons
College football undefeated seasons
Miami Hurricanes football